Qala Phusa (Aymara qala stone, phusa siku, "stone siku", also spelled Khala Phusa) or Q'ululu (Aymara for stallion of a llama, alpaca or vicuña, Hispanicized spelling Cololo) is a  mountain in the Apolobamba mountain range in Bolivia. It situated in the La Paz Department, Franz Tamayo Province, Pelechuco Municipality. Qala Phusa lies southwest of Waracha and southeast of  Jach'a Waracha.

References 

Mountains of La Paz Department (Bolivia)
Glaciers of Bolivia
Five-thousanders of the Andes